Vicu Bulmaga (born 5 July 2003) is a Moldovan professional footballer who plays as a defender for Isloch Minsk Raion.

Club career
Bulmaga started his career in his native Moldova with Dacia Buiucani before a move to Czech side Teplice in 2021. He started well for the club's 'B' team, scoring a number of goals. He marked his second appearance in the Czech First League with an own goal in a 2–0 loss to Pardubice.

Career statistics

Club

Notes

References

2003 births
Living people
Moldovan footballers
Moldova youth international footballers
Association football defenders
Association football midfielders
Moldovan Super Liga players
Bohemian Football League players
Czech First League players
Dacia Buiucani players
FK Teplice players
FC Isloch Minsk Raion players
Expatriate footballers in the Czech Republic
Expatriate footballers in Belarus